Philip Henry Christopher Jackson CVO DL (born 18 April 1944) is a Scottish sculptor, noted for his modern style and emphasis on form.  Acting as Royal Sculptor to Queen Elizabeth II, his sculptures appear in numerous UK cities, as well as Argentina and Switzerland.

His twice life-size (6 metre tall) bronze statue of Bobby Moore was erected outside the main entrance at the new Wembley Stadium in May 2007, to pay tribute to his effect on the game.

Philip Jackson was born in Scotland during the Second World War and now works at the Edward Lawrence Studio in Midhurst, West Sussex and lives nearby. He went to the Farnham School of Art (now the University for the Creative Arts). After leaving school, he was a press photographer for a year and then joined a design company as a sculptor. Half of his time is spent on commissions and the other half on his gallery sculpture. He is well known for his major outdoor pieces, such as the Young Mozart in Chelsea and the Jersey Liberation sculpture. His sources of inspiration have been Jacob Epstein, Auguste Rodin, Henry Moore, Oscar Nemon and Kenneth Armitage. But the most powerful influences in his life are his wife Jean and son Jamie who work with him. 

Philip Jackson describes his art in the following words:

Honours
Jackson was appointed Commander of the Royal Victorian Order (CVO) in the 2009 Queen's Birthday Honours List.

On 1 April 2008, Jackson was appointed a Deputy Lieutenant of West Sussex.

His work on the RAF Bomber Command Memorial won him the 2013 Marsh Award for Excellence in Public Sculpture.

Commissions

Wolfgang Amadeus Mozart – Belgravia, London
Falklands War Sculpture – Portsmouth
Liberation Sculpture – Jersey, Channel Islands
Sir Matt Busby – Old Trafford, Manchester
Empress Elisabeth of Austria – Geneva, Switzerland
St Richard – Chichester Cathedral
King George VI – Britannia Royal Naval College, Dartmouth
The Gurkha Monument – Horse Guards Avenue
1966 World Cup Sculpture – Newham, London
Queen Elizabeth II – Windsor Great Park
Queen Elizabeth, the Queen Mother - London
Bobby Moore and Sir Alf Ramsey – Wembley Stadium, London
United Trinity – Old Trafford, Manchester
Sir Alex Ferguson – Old Trafford, Manchester
Peter Osgood – Stamford Bridge, Fulham
Korean War Memorial – London
Statue of Constantine the Great, York
RAF Bomber Command Memorial - London

As well as producing commissions, Jackson also creates 'studio' works, mainly theatrical subjects. One of his most celebrated works was the life-size nude, Maggie Reading.

It was announced on 6 September 2019 that Mr Jackson had been commissioned to build the National Emergency Services Memorial which was being backed by the Duke of Cambridge and Prime Minister Boris Johnson.

References

External links

Philip Jackson Sculptures — artist's website

Scottish sculptors
Scottish male sculptors
 
1944 births
Living people
Commanders of the Royal Victorian Order
Deputy Lieutenants of West Sussex
Alumni of the University of Bristol
People from Inverness
20th-century British sculptors
21st-century British sculptors
21st-century male artists
Rother Valley artists